Conduit current collection is an obsolete system of electric current collection used by some electric tramways, where the power supply was carried in a 'conduit' (a small tunnel) under the roadway. Modern systems fall under the term ground-level power supply.

Description
The power rails are contained in a conduit midway between and below the two surface rails on which the cars operate, in much the same fashion as the cable for cable cars. Power reached the car by means of an attachment, called a plough (US plow), that rode in the conduit beneath the car. The plough had two metal shoes attached to springs that pushed sideways against the power rails. The plough was normally connected to a platform that could slide laterally to conform with variations in the placement of the conduit, for example in some areas there was a conduit for cable cars adjacent to the one for electric cars.

The current was carried by a flexible cable from the plough through the platform to the car's controller and motor(s).  The running rails are not part of the electrical circuit.  In the United States, the cars were sometimes popularly but incorrectly called trolleys but did not typically draw power through a trolley pole from an overhead wire as (strictly defined) trolley cars do.

Usage

Conduit current collection was one of the first ways of supplying power to trams but it proved to be much more expensive, complicated and trouble-prone than overhead wires.  When electric street railways became ubiquitous, it was only used in those cities that did not permit overhead wires, including London, Paris, Berlin, Marseilles, Vienna, Budapest, and Prague in Europe, and the New York City borough of Manhattan and Washington, D.C. in the United States.

In Denver, Colorado, the world's second electric street railway in 1885 pioneered conduit current collection.  Difficulties with the conduit and the streetcars led to the replacement of conduit cars and lines with cable cars by 1888.

New York City had the largest installation of conduit cars, due to the prohibition of overhead wires on Manhattan Island, although a few Bronx-based trolley lines entered the northern reaches of Manhattan using overhead wire.  Trolley lines from Brooklyn and Queens also entered Manhattan under wire, but did not use city streets.  The primary reason for the initial adoption of conduit systems was for aesthetic reasons as an alternative to overhead wiring that was often objected to as being unsightly.

The expense of creating conduit lines in New York was reduced where it was possible to convert the cable vaults from discontinued cable car lines. The huge cost of building new conduits gave New York the distinction of having one of the last horsecar lines (the Bleecker Street Line) in the U.S., not closing until 1917. (Pittsburgh ran the last U.S. horsecar, in 1923.)

In some old photographs, two "slots" may be seen between the rails. In New York City, sometimes one slot was used for a cable line and the other for electric cars. Occasionally, two competing lines shared a common track and had independent slots for the ploughs of the respective cars. In London, two slots were sometimes used on a single-track stretch in a narrow road so that cars in each direction used separate conduits. Known as twin-conduit track, examples were found in York Road, Wandsworth and London Street, Greenwich.

In New York City, the Queensboro Bridge between Manhattan and Queens had tracks installed on the outer lanes with conduits for Manhattan cars in addition to overhead wires. The conduit allowed them to run to Queens Plaza terminus without need for removing the plough and raising the poles. In later years the conduit was removed and only trolley wire remained.

In London, the London County Council Tramways experimented with side conduit, where the conduit was in one of the side rails. This was tried along Kingsland Road between Bentley Road and Basing  Place, Hoxton, but the stresses and strains of the weight of the cars weakened the conduit, so it was not tried elsewhere.

In the centre of Brussels some tram lines were fitted with conduits, the last ones being converted to overhead operation during World War II.

The system was tried in the seaside resort of Blackpool, UK, but was soon abandoned as sand and saltwater entered the conduit and caused breakdowns and there was a problem with voltage drop. Some sections of track still had the conduit slot visible until the tramway was refurbished in 2012.

Hybrid installations
Washington, D.C.  had a large network of conduit lines, to avoid wires.  Some lines used overhead wires when they approached rural or suburban areas.  The last such line ran to Cabin John, Maryland. The current collector "plow" was mounted underneath the car on a fitting just forward of the rear truck on PCC streetcars. It had two cables with female connectors on cables to attach to matching cables of the car's electrical system. A "plowman" was assigned at each changeover point from overhead trolley wire to conduit to remove the cable attachments to the car and stow the plow, which did not remain with the car and was reattached in an incoming car running on overhead wire. The lower section of the plow "board" was drawn by the moving car within the cavity of the conduit. Because of this usage, many of Washington's streetcars carried trolley poles, which were lowered while operating in the central part of the city; when the cars reached a point where they switched to overhead operation, they stopped over a plow pit where the conduit plows were detached and the trolley poles raised, the reverse operation taking place on inbound runs.  The 'pit' here has the meaning analogous to racing circuit pits rather than a depression in the road.

In the UK, London had a hybrid network of double-deck trams: overhead collection was used in the outer sections and conduit in the centre.  At the changeover from conduit to overhead wire, at a change pit, the process was largely automatic.  The conductor put the trolley pole onto the wire, and as the tram moved forward the conduit channel veered sideways to outside the running track, automatically ejecting the plough - the tram was said to be 'shooting the plough'.  At the changeover from overhead wire to conduit the process was a little more complicated.  The tram pulled up alongside a ploughman, who engaged a two-pronged plough fork over the plough in a short length of unelectrified conduit and into the plough channel underneath the centre of the tram.  As the tram drew forward, the conduit channel moved under the tram, carrying the plough into position.  The conductor pulled down the trolley pole and stowed it.  The ploughman's job was a fairly skilled one because, if he failed to locate the plough fork correctly, it or the plough could jam in the plough channel and cause lengthy delays.  Some tram designs required an extra carrier to be located with the plough and these frequently caused problems for ploughmen not used to the design (particularly if the tram had been diverted from its normal route).

New conduit track was laid in 1951 for the Festival of Britain, which commemorated the Great Exhibition of 1851.  The last tram was withdrawn in June 1952 and virtually all the tracks had been removed by the 1970s, although a short section can still be seen at the entrance to the former Kingsway Tramway Subway.

Other European hybrid tramway networks included Paris, Nice, Lyon, Lille and Bordeaux in France; Berlin, Vienna and Budapest. In Paris, the conduit sections were frequently very short, requiring cars to change from overhead to conduit and back several times in one journey. The last conduit line in Paris closed in 1936, while the last Bordeaux conduit car ran in 1953. The conduit systems in Berlin, Vienna and Budapest were very short lived, being replaced by overhead wires before World War I.

See also

Current collector
Ground-level power supply
Online Electric Vehicle
Railway electrification system
Third rail
Tramway tracks

Notes

External links
Illustrated articles on London's conduits and the Kingsway Tram Subway.
Information, photographs and some sound clips about the ground level power supply system currently being used in Bordeaux, France.

Electric rail transport
Tram technology